Uptino (Opto) is a rural locality (a village) in Yumatovsky Selsoviet, Ufimsky District, Bashkortostan, Russia. The population was 324 as of 2010. There are 15 streets.

Geography 
Uptino is located 29 km southwest of Ufa (the district's administrative centre) by road. Stantsii Yumatovo is the nearest rural locality.

References 

Rural localities in Ufimsky District